The exclamation mark, or exclamation point (American English), is a punctuation mark usually used after an interjection or exclamation to indicate strong feelings or to show emphasis. The exclamation mark often marks the end of a sentence, for example: "Watch out!". Similarly, a bare exclamation mark (with nothing before or after) is often used in warning signs. The exclamation mark is often used in writing to make a character seem as though they are shouting and/or excited/surprised.

Other uses include:
 In mathematics, it denotes the factorial operation.
 Several computer languages use  at the beginning of an expression to denote logical negation. For example, means "the logical negation of A", also called "not A". This usage has spread to ordinary language (e.g., "!clue" means no-clue or clueless).
 Some languages use  to denote a click consonant.

History
Graphically, the exclamation mark is represented by variations on the theme of a full stop point with a vertical line above. One theory of its origin posits derivation from a Latin exclamation of joy, namely , analogous to "hurray"; copyists wrote the Latin word  at the end of a sentence, to indicate expression of joy. Over time, the i moved above the o; that o first became smaller, and (with time) a dot.

In the 15th century, the exclamation mark was introduced into English printing to show emphasis. It was later called by many names, including point of admiration (1611), note of exclamation or admiration (1657), sign of admiration or exclamation, exclamation point (1824), and finally, exclamation mark (1839).

Many older or portable typewriters did not have the exclamation mark. Instead the user typed a full stop and then backspaced and overtyped an apostrophe.

Slang and other names for the exclamation mark
Now obsolete, the name ecphoneme was documented in the early 20th century.

In the 1950s, secretarial dictation and typesetting manuals in America referred to the mark as "bang", perhaps from comic books – where the ! appeared in dialogue balloons to represent a gun being fired – although the nickname probably emerged from letterpress printing. This "bang" usage is behind the names of the interrobang, an unconventional typographic character, and a shebang, a feature of Unix computer systems.

In the printing world, the exclamation mark can be called a screamer, a gasper, a slammer, a dog's cock, or a startler.

In hacker culture, the exclamation mark is called "bang", "shriek", or, in the British slang known as Commonwealth Hackish, "". For example, the password communicated in the spoken phrase "Your password is em-zero-pee-aitch-bang-en-three" ("" in Commonwealth Hackish) is m0ph!n3.

Languages 

The exclamation mark is common to languages using the Latin alphabet, although usage varies slightly between languages. It has also been adopted in languages written in other scripts, such as languages written with Cyrillic or Arabic scripts, Chinese characters, and Devanagari.

English 
A sentence ending in an exclamation mark may represent an exclamation or an interjection (such as "Wow!", "Boo!"), or an imperative ("Stop!"), or may indicate astonishment or surprise: "They were the footprints of a gigantic hound!" Exclamation marks are occasionally placed mid-sentence with a function similar to a comma, for dramatic effect, although this usage is obsolete: "On the walk, oh! there was a frightful noise."

Informally, exclamation marks may be repeated for additional emphasis ("That's great!!!"), but this practice is generally considered unacceptable in formal prose.

The exclamation mark is sometimes used in conjunction with the question mark. This can be in protest or astonishment ("Out of all places, the squatter-camp?!"); a few writers replace this with a single, nonstandard punctuation mark, the interrobang, which is the combination of a question mark and an exclamation mark.

Overly frequent use of the exclamation mark is generally considered poor writing, as it distracts the reader and decreases the mark's significance.

Some authors, most notably Tom Wolfe, are known for unashamedly liberal use of the exclamation mark. In comic books, the very frequent use of exclamation mark is common—see Comics, below.

For information on the use of spaces after an exclamation mark, see the discussion of spacing after a full stop.

Several studies have shown that women use exclamation marks more than men do. One study suggests that, in addition to other uses, exclamation marks may also function as markers of friendly interaction, for example, by making "Hi!" or "Good luck!" seem friendlier than simply "Hi." or "Good luck." (with periods). However, use of exclamation marks in contexts that are not unambiguously positive can be misinterpreted as indicating hostility.

In English writing and often subtitles, a (!) symbol (an exclamation mark within parentheses) implies that a character has made an obviously sarcastic comment e.g.: "Ooh, a sarcasm detector. That's a really useful invention(!)" It also is used to indicate surprise at one's own experience or statement.

French 

In French, as well as marking exclamations or indicating astonishment, the exclamation mark is also commonly used to mark orders or requests:  (English: 'Come here!'). When available, a 'narrow no-break space' is used between the last word and the exclamation mark in European French. If not, a regular non-breaking space is currently used. In Canadian French, either no space is used or a small space is inserted if available. One can also combine an exclamation mark with a question mark at the end of a sentence where appropriate.

Fula in Adlam
For example, "No!".

German 
German uses the exclamation mark for several things that English conveys with other punctuation:
 It is used at the end of imperative sentences even when not particularly emphatic:  ('Call me tomorrow.') A normal full stop, as in English, is fairly common but is considered substandard.
 A related use is on signs that express a command or interdiction:  (English: 'No trespassing!').
 The exclamation mark may also be used in the salutation line of a letter:  (English: 'Dear Hans,'). However, the use of a comma is equally correct and is more common.

Cantonese 
Cantonese has not historically used dedicated punctuation marks, rather relying on grammatical markers to denote the end of a statement. Usage of exclamation marks is common in written Mandarin and in some Yue speaking regions. The Canton and Hong Kong regions, however, generally refused to accept the exclamation mark as it was seen as carrying with it unnecessary and confusing Western connotations; however, an exclamation mark, including in some written representations of colloquy in Cantonese, can be used informally to indicate strong feeling.

Mandarin Chinese

Greek
In Modern Greek, the exclamation mark has been introduced from Latin scripts and is used identically, although without the reluctance seen in English usage. A minor grammatical difference is that, while a series of interjections each employ an exclamation mark (e.g., 'Oops! Oh!'), an interjection should only be separated from an extended exclamation by a comma (e.g., 'Oops! I left the stove on.').

Hungarian 
In Hungarian, an exclamation mark is put at the end of exclamatory, imperative or prohibitive sentences, and sentences expressing a wish (e.g.  – 'How beautiful!',  – 'Keep off the grass',  – 'If only my plan would work out.').
The use of the exclamation mark is also needed when addressing someone and the addressing is a separate sentence. (typically at the beginning of letters, e.g.  – 'Dear Peter,').
Greetings are also typically terminated with an exclamation mark (e.g.  – 'Good evening.').

Solomon Islands Pidgin
In Solomon Islands Pidgin, the phrase may be between admiration marks.

Spanish 

In Spanish, a sentence or clause ending in an exclamation mark must also begin with an inverted exclamation mark (the same also applies to the question mark): , 'Are you crazy? You almost killed her!'

As in British English, a bracketed exclamation mark may be used to indicate irony or surprise at a statement: , 'He said that he's not going to a party tonight(!).' Such use is not matched by an inverted opening exclamation mark.

Turkish 

In Turkish, an exclamation mark is used after a sentence or phrase for emphasis, and is common following both commands and the addressees of such commands. Your first target is the Mediterranean') order by Atatürk,  ('the armies') constitute the addressee. It is further used in parentheses, after a sentence or phrase to indicate irony or sarcasm: , 'You've done a very good job – Not!'.

Limbu 

In Limbu, an exclamation mark is used after a Limbu sentence or phrase for emphasis, and is common following both commands and the addressees of such commands. For example, in the Limbu sentence ᤐᤚᤢ᥄ ᤄᤨᤘᤑ ᤂᤥᤆᤌᤙ Mediterranean, ᤚᤦᤛᤅ᥄ — Paṡu! Ghōwapha khōcathaśa Mediterranean, ṡausaṅa! (Armies! Your first target is the Mediterranean!). It is further used in parentheses, (᥄), after a sentence or phrase to indicate irony or sarcasm: ᤖᤥᤂᤌ ᤔᤚᤗ ᤐᤤ ᤊᤇ ᤃᤦᤄ (᥄) — Rōkhatha maṡala pai yancha gaugha (!) (You did a very good job — Not!).

Phonetics 

In Khoisan languages, and the International Phonetic Alphabet, the exclamation mark is used as a letter to indicate the postalveolar click sound (represented as q in Zulu orthography).

The exclamation mark has sometimes been used as a phonetic symbol to indicate that a consonant is ejective. More commonly this is represented by an apostrophe, or a superscript glottal stop symbol.

Proper names
Although not part of dictionary words, exclamation marks appear in some brand names and trade names, including Yum! Brands (parent of fast food chains like Taco Bell and KFC), Web services Yahoo! and Joomla!, and the online game Kahoot!. It appears in the titles of stage and screen works, especially comedies and musicals; examples include the game show Jeopardy!; the '60s musical TV show Shindig!; musicals Oklahoma!, Mamma Mia!, Oliver! and Oh! Calcutta!; and movies Airplane! and Moulin Rouge!. Writer Elliot S! Maggin and cartoonist Scott Shaw! include exclamation marks in their names. In the 2016 United States presidential campaign, Republican candidate Jeb Bush used "Jeb!" as his campaign logo.

Place names

The English town of Westward Ho!, named after the novel by Charles Kingsley, is the only place name in the United Kingdom that officially contains an exclamation mark. There is a town in Quebec called Saint-Louis-du-Ha! Ha!, which is spelled with two exclamation marks. The city of Hamilton, Ohio, changed its name to Hamilton! in 1986, but neither the United States Board on Geographic Names nor mapmakers Rand McNally recognised the change. The city of Ostrava, Czech Republic, changed its logotype to Ostrava!!! in 2008.

Warnings

Exclamation marks are used to emphasize a precautionary statement.

On warning signs, an exclamation mark is often used to draw attention to a warning of danger, hazards, and the unexpected. These signs are common in hazardous environments or on potentially dangerous equipment. A common type of this warning is a yellow triangle with a black exclamation mark, but a white triangle with a red border is common on European road warning signs.

Use in various fields

Mathematics and formal logic

In elementary mathematics, the symbol represents the factorial operation. The expression ! means "the product of the integers from 1 to ". For example, 4! (read four factorial) is 4 × 3 × 2 × 1 = 24. (0! is defined as 1, which is a neutral element in multiplication, not multiplied by anything.) Additionally, it can also represent the uniqueness quantifier or, if used in front of a number, it can represent a subfactorial.

In linear logic, the exclamation mark denotes one of the modalities that control weakening and contraction.

Computing
In computing, the exclamation mark is ASCII character 33 (21 in hexadecimal). Due to its availability on even early computers, the character was used for many purposes. The name given to "!" by programmers varies according to their background, though it was very common to give it a short name to make reading code aloud easier. "Bang" is very popular. In the UK the term pling was popular in the earlier days of computing, whilst in the United States, the term shriek was used. It is claimed that these word usages were invented in the US and shriek is from Stanford or MIT; however, shriek for the ! sign is found in the Oxford English Dictionary dating from the 1860s.

Many computer languages using C-style syntax use "!" for logical negation;  means "not A", and  means "A is not equal to B". This negation principle has spread to ordinary language; for example, the word "!clue" is used as a synonym for "no-clue" or "clueless". The symbol in formal logic for negation is  but, as this symbol is not present as standard on some keyboards, the C convention has spread informally to other contexts.

Early e-mail systems also used the exclamation mark as a separator character between hostnames for routing information, usually referred to as "bang path" notation.

In the IRC protocol, a user's nickname and ident are separated by an exclamation mark in the hostmask assigned to him or her by the server.

In UNIX scripting (typically for UNIX shell or Perl), "!" is usually used after a "#" in the first line of a script, the interpreter directive, to tell the OS what program to use to run the script.  is usually called a "hash-bang" or shebang.

An exclamation mark starts history expansions in many Unix shells such as bash and tcsh where  executes the previous command and  refers to all of the arguments from the previous command.

Acorn RISC OS uses filenames starting with pling to create an application directory: for instance a file called !Run is executed when the folder containing it is double-clicked (holding down shift prevents this). There is also !Boot (executed the first time the application containing it comes into view of the filer), !Sprites (icons), !Help, and others.

BBC BASIC used pling as an indirection operator, equivalent to PEEK and POKE of four bytes at once.

In the Haskell programming language, "!" is used to express strictness.

In the Kotlin programming language, "!!" ("double-bang") is the not-null assertion operator, used to override null safety so as to allow a null pointer exception.

In the ML programming language (including Standard ML and OCaml), "!" is the operator to get the value out of a "reference" data structure.

In the Raku programming language, the "!" twigil is used to access private attributes or methods in a class (like class Person { has $!name; } or self!private-method;).

In the Scheme, Julia, and Ruby programming languages, "!" is conventionally the suffix for functions and special forms that mutate their input.

In the Swift programming language, a type followed by "!" denotes an "implicitly unwrapped optional", an option type where the compiler does not enforce safe unwrapping. The "!" operator "force unwraps" an option type, causing an error if it is nil.

In Geek Code version 3, "!" is used before a letter to denote that the geek refuses to participate in the topic at hand. In some cases, it has an alternate meaning, such as G! denoting a geek of no qualifications, !d denoting not wearing any clothes, P! denoting not being allowed to use Perl, and so on. They all share some negative connotations, however.

Video games
The exclamation mark can be used in video games to signify that a character is startled or alarmed. In the Metal Gear and Paper Mario series, an exclamation mark appears over enemies' heads when they notice the player.

In massively multiplayer online (MMO) games such as World of Warcraft, an exclamation mark hovering over a character's head is often used to indicate that they are offering a quest for the player to complete.

In Dota 2, an exclamation mark is shown above the head of a unit if it is killed by means not granting enemies experience or gold (if it is "denied").

In the 2005 arcade dance simulation game In the Groove 2, there is a song titled "!" (also referred to as "bang") by the artist Onyx.

Internet culture

In Internet culture, especially where leet is used, multiple exclamation marks may be affixed with the numeral "1" as in !!!!!!111. The notation originates from a common error: when typing multiple exclamation points quickly, the typist may fail to hold the  combination that produces the exclamation mark on many keyboard layouts. This error, first used intentionally as a joke in the leet linguistic community, is now an accepted form of exclamation in leet and derivative dialects such as Lolspeak. Some utterances include further substitutions, for example "!!!111oneeleven".

In fandom and fanfiction, ! is used to signify a defining quality in a character, usually signifying an alternative interpretation of a character from a canonical work. Examples of this would be "Romantic!Draco" or "Vampire!Harry" from Harry Potter fandom. It is also used to clarify the current persona of a character with multiple identities or appearances, such as to distinguish "Armor!Al" from "Human!Al" in a work based on Fullmetal Alchemist. The origin of this usage is unknown, although it is hypothesized to have originated with certain Teenage Mutant Ninja Turtles action figures, for example, "Football Player! Leonardo", "Rockstar! Raphael", and "Breakdancer! Michelangelo".

Comics

Some comic books, especially superhero comics of the mid-20th century, routinely use the exclamation point instead of the period, which means the character has just realized something; unlike when the question mark appears instead, which means the character is confused, surprised or they do not know what is happening. This tends to lead to exaggerated speech, in line with the other hyperboles common in comic books. A portion of the motivation, however, was simply that a period might disappear in the printing process used at the time, whereas an exclamation point would likely remain recognizable even if there was a printing glitch. For a short period Stan Lee, as editor-in-chief of Marvel Comics, attempted to curb their overuse by a short-lived ban on exclamation points altogether, which led to an inadvertent lack of ending punctuation on many sentences.

Comic book writer Elliot S! Maggin once accidentally signed his name with an exclamation due to the habit of using them when writing comic scripts; it became his professional name from then on. Similarly, comic artist Scott Shaw! has used the exclamation point after his name throughout his career.

In comic books and comics in general, a large exclamation point is often used near or over a character's head to indicate surprise. A question mark can similarly be used to indicate confusion.

Chess

In chess notation "!" denotes a good move, "!!" denotes an excellent move, "?!" denotes a dubious move, and "!?" denotes an interesting, risky move. In some chess variants such as large-board Shogi variants, "!" is used to record pieces capturing by stationary feeding or burning.

Scrabble
In Scrabble, an exclamation mark written after a word is used to indicate its presence in the Official Tournament and Club Word List but its absence from the Official Scrabble Players Dictionary, usually because the word has been judged offensive.

Baseball
Exclamation points or asterisks can be used on scorecards to denote a "great defensive play".

Popular music
The band !!! (pronounced "Chk Chk Chk") uses exclamation points as its name.

In 2008, the pop-punk band Panic! at the Disco dropped the exclamation point in its name; this became the "most-discussed topic on [fan] message boards around the world". In 2009, the exclamation mark was re-inserted following the band's split.

The band Bomb the Music Industry! utilizes an exclamation mark in its name, as well as several album and song titles and promotional material. Examples include their songs "(Shut) Up The Punx!!!" and the album Adults!!!: Smart!!! Shithammered!!! And Excited by Nothing!!!!!!!.

American musician Pink stylizes her stage name "P!NK", and uses three exclamation points in the subtitle of her 2010 release, Greatest Hits... So Far!!!.

Television

The exclamation mark was included in the title of Dinah Shore's TV series, Dinah! The exclamation mark was later the subject of a bitter argument between Elaine Benes and her boyfriend, Jake Jarmel, in the Seinfeld episode, "The Sniffing Accountant". Elaine got upset with Jake for not putting an exclamation mark at the end of a message about her friend having a baby. Jake took extreme exception to the trivial criticism and broke up with Elaine, putting an exclamation mark after his parting words: "I'm leaving!"

Theatre
In musicals, an exclamation mark is usually used when the title of the show has the same title of a song within the act. Examples of this are shows like Oklahoma! and Mamma Mia!.

Unicode code-points (with HTML)

  (HTML &#33;, &excl;)

Related forms have these code points:
 
  (In IPA: alveolar click)
  (for use in vertical text)
  with emoji variation selector
 
 
  (for use in vertical text)
  (for use in vertical text)
  with emoji variation selector
  (exclamation mark in triangle)
  (in Unicode lingo, "white" means hollow)
 
 
 
  with emoji variation selector
 
 
 
 
 
  (for special applications within CJK text)
  (for special applications within CJK text)
 

Some emojis include an exclamation mark:
 
 

Some scripts have their own exclamation mark:

See also
 Full stop
 Inverted question and exclamation marks
 Punctuation
 Terminal punctuation

Notes

References

Further reading

External links

 U+0021 exclamation point — Decode Unicode

Punctuation